he 2017–18 Rwandan Cup is the 36th season of the football cup competition of Rwanda.
The competition is organized by the Rwandese Association Football Federation (RAF) and open to all clubs in Rwanda.

Preliminary round
The preliminary round are played on 30 January 2018.

Play-off round
The Play-off round are played on 3 February 2018.

Round of 32
The Round of 32 are played on 6 & 7 February 2018 first legs and 21 & 22 February 2018 second legs.
First leg

Second legs

1–0 on aggregate. Sorwathe FC failed to turn up for the game.

Amagaju won with 4–1 on aggregate.

AS Kigali won with 6–1 on aggregate.

2–2 on aggregate. Marines qualifies on Away goal rule.

Police won with 3–1 on aggregate.

Bugesera won with 2–0 on aggregate.

Musanze won with 8–1 on aggregate.

Kiyovu Sports won with 11–3 on aggregate.

Mukura Victory Sports won with 3–0 on aggregate.

Pepiniere won with 4–1 on aggregate.

AS Muhanga won with 2–1 on aggregate.

Etincelles won with 4–0 on aggregate.

Sunrise won with 3–0 on aggregate, after Miroplast failed to turn up for the game.

0–0 on aggregate. La Jeunesse won 5–4, after penalties.

Round of 16
First Legs

[Apr 2]

Mukura                 3-2 AS Kigali              

Pepinière              0-1 Marines                

Espoir                 2-1 Sunrise                

[Apr 3]

La Jeunesse            0-3 APR                    

AS Muhanga             2-1 Amagaju                

Musanze                2-1 Police                 

[Apr 4] 

Kiyovu Sports          1-1 Bugesera               

[Apr 25]

Etincelles             1-1 Rayon Sports           
 
Second Legs

[Apr 5]

AS Kigali              1-2 Mukura                 

Sunrise                2-0 Espoir                 

Marines                1-0 Pepinière              

[Apr 6]

Police                 3-0 Musanze                

Bugesera               0-0 Kiyovu Sports          

APR                    0-0 La Jeunesse            

Amagaju                1-0 AS Muhanga             

[May 23]

Rayon Sports           2-0 Etincelles

Quarter-finals
First Legs

[Jul 20] 

Sunrise                2-0 Bugesera               

Mukura                 1-0 Amagaju                

Police                 0-0 APR                    

[Jul 21] 

Marines                0-1 Rayon Sports           
 
Second Legs

[Jul 23] 

Amagaju                0-0 Mukura                 

Bugesera               1-0 Sunrise                

[Jul 24] 

Rayon Sports           3-1 Marines                

[Jul 26] 

APR                    3-0 Police

Semi-finals
First Legs 

[Aug 3]

Mukura                 0-0 APR                    

[Aug 6]

Sunrise                2-1 Rayon Sports           

Second Legs 

[Aug 8]

APR                    1-1 Mukura                 

[Aug 9]

Rayon Sports           2-0 Sunrise

Third place match
[Aug 12]

Sunrise                0-1 APR

Final
[Aug 12]

Mukura Victory Sports 0-0 (aet, 3-1 pen) Rayon Sport

References

Football competitions in Rwanda
Rwanda